Profiles of African-American Success is an American documentary web series produced by Frances Presley-Rice and filmmaker Bayer Mack for their production company Block Starz Music Television. The documentary series features short biographies of African-American businesses and entrepreneurs.

Development
Profiles of African-American Success was originally developed by executive producer Frances Presley-Rice in conjunction with  The Washington Times as a ten-part weekly video series for Dr. Ben Carson's digital magazine, American CurrentSee. The series is now distributed exclusively by BSMTV through its official website, Vimeo and YouTube channels and on various community television stations. During the promotion for his documentary film, The Czar of Black Hollywood, director Bayer Mack said his goal with Profiles of African-American Success was to carry on The Czar of Black Hollywood's theme of celebrating black Americans who succeeded in the face of Jim Crow and other challenges.

Featured profiles

Profiles of African-American Success has featured the following black entrepreneurs and institutions:

 Junius G. Groves: Gilded Age Business Magnate
 Robert S. Abbott: Millionaire Newspaper Publisher
 Jeremiah G. Hamilton: The Dark Prince of Wall Street
 Harry H. Pace: America's First Black Record Label Owner
 Frederick D. Patterson: America's Only Black Car Manufacturer
 Homer B. Roberts: America's First Black Auto Dealer
 Reginald F. Lewis: America's First Black Billion Dollar Businessman
 Paul R. Williams: Architect to the Stars
 Don H. Barden: King of Detroit
 Richard "Dick" Griffey: Music Industry Kingpin
 Alpha Kappa Alpha: A Legacy of Sisterhood and Service
 Sylvia Robinson: Mother of Hip-Hop
 Gamble and Huff: The Sound of Philadelphia
 The Million Man March: 20 Year Anniversary
 Miss Black America: The Pageant Changed History
 Vee-Jay Records: Most Successful Black Owned Label Before Motown
 George E. Johnson, Sr.: First Black Company on American Stock Exchange
 Cathy L. Hughes: First Black Woman to Head a Publicly-traded Company
 Jerry Lawson: A Black Man Developed the First Cartridge Video Game Console
 Black Journal: America's Most Dangerous Public Television Show

Narrators
Season 1 of Profiles of African-American Success was presented by William Bell, who had worked with the producers on The Czar of Black Hollywood. Seasons 2 and 3 employed relatively unknown African-American voice actors and actresses. The premiere episode for Season 4 features narration by noted media professional Dyana Williams in a tribute to her friend, Radio One founder Cathy Hughes.

Reception
The critical and public response to the documentary series has been generally favorable with many praising its effort to showcase positive aspects of the African-American experience.

References

External links
 
 

2014 web series debuts
2010s American documentary television series
English-language television shows
American non-fiction web series
Viral videos